Demidov is a rural locality (a selo) and the administrative center of Demidovskoye Rural Settlement, Bykovsky District, Volgograd Oblast, Russia. The population was 599 as of 2010. There are 14 streets.

Geography 
Demidov is located 87 km south of Bykovo (the district's administrative centre) by road. Stolyarov is the nearest rural locality.

References 

Rural localities in Bykovsky District